Young Toscanini (original title: Il giovane Toscanini) is a 1988 Italian-French biographical drama film directed by Franco Zeffirelli and starring C. Thomas Howell and Elizabeth Taylor. It was screened out of competition at the 45th edition of the Venice Film Festival.

Premise
The film charts the early career and romances of the conductor Arturo Toscanini in Rio de Janeiro in 1886.

Cast
 C. Thomas Howell as Arturo Toscanini
 Elizabeth Taylor as Nadina Bulichoff (singing voice was dubbed by Aprile Millo)
 Sophie Ward as Sorella Margherita
 Philippe Noiret as Dom Pedro II
 Franco Nero as Claudio Toscanini
 Pat Heywood as Mother Allegri
 Jean-Pierre Cassel as Maestro Miguez
 John Rhys-Davies as Claudio Rossi
 Valentina Cortese (cameo)

References

External links

1988 films
1980s biographical films
1980s musical films
Italian biographical drama films
French biographical drama films
1980s English-language films
English-language French films
English-language Italian films
Films directed by Franco Zeffirelli
Biographical films about musicians
Films set in the 1880s
Films set in Brazil
Films about slavery
Films about classical music and musicians
1980s Italian films
1980s French films